Print the Legend is a 2014 documentary film and Netflix Original focused on the 3D printing revolution. It delves into the growth of the 3D printing industry, with focus on startup companies MakerBot and Formlabs, established companies Stratasys, PrintForm and 3D Systems, and figures of controversy in the industry such as Cody Wilson.

The title of the film comes from the denouement of the film The Man Who Shot Liberty Valance.

A trailer for the film is available at the documentary's official website.

It was filmed on Canon EOS C300 and Canon EOS C100.

Synopsis

Print the Legend portrays some of the history and achievements of several 3D printing companies, including MakerBot, Formlabs, Stratasys, and 3D Systems.

The documentary also explores the relationship between the 3D printing industry and the gun rights advocacy movement. Cody Wilson, who is known for gun rights advocacy and specifically for promoting the 3D printing of guns, is interviewed extensively in the documentary.

 Alan Cramer
 David Cranor
 Michael Curry
 Malo Delarue
 Brad Feld
 Ian Ferguson
 Lorenzo Franceschi-Bicchierai
 Martin Galese
 Matthew Griffin
 James Gunipero
 Zach Hoeken
 Luke Iseman
 Annelise Jeske
 Brad Kenney
 Eric Klein
 Cliff Kuang
 Jenny Lawton
 Natan Linder
 Ira Liss
 Alex Lobovsky
 Larisa Lobovsky
 Maxim Lobovsky
 Marty Markowitz
 Adam Mayer
 Nathan Meyers
 Jennifer Milne
 Anthony Moschella
 Will O'Brien
 Jeff Osborn
 Andrew Pelkey
 Bre Pettis
 Chuck Pettis
 Yoav Reches
 Avi Reichental
 David Reis
 Barry Schuler
 Virginia White
 Cody Wilson
 Luke Winston

Festivals 
Awards
 Special Jury Recognition Award - SXSW Film Festival (2014)
 Special Jury Award - IFF Boston (2014)

References

External links
 Official website
 
 

2014 films
3D printing
Netflix original documentary films
2010s English-language films